The Molecular and Behavioral Neuroscience Institute at the University of Michigan (UM) is an interdisciplinary research institute, which played a key role in the development of general systems theory. Formerly the Mental Health Research Institute, over the years it developed a specific interest in neuroscience and biological psychiatry and was subsequently renamed in the new millennium.

The institute was established as Mental Health Research Institute at the University of Michigan in 1955 with the goal of "applying scientific methods to the study of human behavior." It became known in the 1950s for employing some of the initial members of the Society for General Systems Research (SGSR) such as biologist and founding director of the institute James Grier Miller, mathematician Anatol Rapoport, physicist John Platt, urban planner Richard L. Meier, economist Walter Cannon, neurophysiologist Ralph Gerard, among others like Margaret Mead and Richard F. Ericson.

References

External links 
 Website. The Molecular & Behavioral Neuroscience Institute (MBNI) of the University of Michigan. The formerly Mental Health Research Institute.

Research institutes established in 1955
Systems science institutes
University of Michigan
1955 establishments in Michigan